Ondřej Dlapa (born November 12, 1991) is a Czech professional ice hockey defenceman. He played with HC Kometa Brno in the Czech Extraliga during the 2010–11 Czech Extraliga playoffs.

Now, he plays for the HC Energie Karlovy Vary.

References

External links

1991 births
Czech ice hockey defencemen
HC Kometa Brno players
Living people
Ice hockey people from Brno
SK Horácká Slavia Třebíč players
Piráti Chomutov players
BK Mladá Boleslav players
HC Karlovy Vary players